Manuel Rodrigues may refer to:
Manuel Rodrigues (footballer, born 1905) (1905-deceased), Portuguese footballer who played as a forward
Manuel C. Rodrigues (1908-1991), Indian poet
Manuel Rodrigues (footballer, born 1942), Portuguese footballer who played as a defender